In music, a medley is a piece composed from parts of existing pieces played one after another, sometimes overlapping. They are common in popular music, and most medleys are songs rather than instrumentals. A medley which is a remixed series is called a megamix, often done with tracks for a single artist, or for popular songs from a given year or genre. A cover version combining elements of multiple pre-existing songs is a cover medley.

A medley is the most common form of overture for musical theatre productions.

In Latin music, medleys are known as potpourrís or mosaicos; the latter were popularized by artists such as Roberto Faz and Billo Frómeta, and most commonly consist of boleros, guarachas, merengues or congas.

See also 
 Segue, a term for the transition between songs
 DJ mix
 Mashup (music)
 List of Genesis medleys
 List of "Weird Al" Yankovic polka medleys
 Suite (music)

External links
COVER.INFO – Large database of cover versions, medleys, samples and other musical quotations

References

 
1980s fads and trends